Bellerive Oval, also known by its sponsored name Blundstone Arena, is a cricket ground in Hobart, Australia. It is the home of the Tasmania cricket team and the Hobart Hurricanes (a Twenty20 team in the Big Bash League), as well as being a Test, One Day International (ODI) and Twenty20 International (T20I) venue. It has a capacity of 16,000 spectators. As of December 2015, the ground has hosted 12 Test matches, the first in 1989 when Australia hosted Sri Lanka. It has also staged 34 ODI matches, the first of which was in 1988 when New Zealand lost to Sri Lanka by four wickets. As of October 2014, two T20Is have been played at the ground. The first was in 2010 when Australia beat the West Indies by 38 runs; the second was in 2014, when Australia defeated England by 13 runs.

The first Test century (100 or more runs in a single innings) scored at the ground was by Australian Mark Taylor in the third innings of the first Test match against Sri Lanka in 1989. In the same innings Dean Jones and Steve Waugh also scored centuries. As of December 2015, 31 Test centuries have been scored at the ground in 12 Test matches. As of December 2015, Adam Voges 269*, scored against West Indies in 2015, is the highest Test innings achieved at the ground and only the second double century (200 or more runs in a single innings) in this ground, after Ricky Ponting's 209, against Pakistan in 2010. The highest Test score by an overseas player is 192 by the Sri Lankan Kumar Sangakkara in 2007. Michael Hussey has scored three Test centuries at the ground, the most by any batsman.

In the second ODI ever at Bellerive Oval, West Indian Desmond Haynes scored the first century at the venue with a score of 101 runs from 112 balls against Pakistan in 1988. In 35 ODIs, a total of 25 centuries have been scored. As of October 2014, the highest ODI score at the ground is 172, scored by Adam Gilchrist, an Australian wicket-keeper. The top scoring non-Australian is Sri Lankan Tillakaratne Dilshan, who scored 160 runs. Dilshan and fellow Sri Lankan Kumar Sangakkara are the only players to have scored two ODI centuries at Bellerive Oval. The top T20I score at the ground is 103* by Australian Glenn Maxwell in 2018.

Key
 An asterisk (*) denotes that the batsman was not out.
 Inns. denotes the number of the innings in which the century was scored.
 Balls denotes the number of balls faced in an innings.
 Parentheses i.e. (1/3) next to the player's name denotes his century number at Bellerive Oval.
 The column title Date refers to the date the match started.

List of centuries

Test centuries
The following table summarises the Test centuries scored at Bellerive Oval.

One Day International centuries
The following table summarises the One Day International centuries scored at Bellerive Oval.

Twenty20 International centuries

References 

Lists of international cricket centuries by ground
Cricket grounds in Australia
Australian cricket lists